David Perry may refer to:

 David Perry (game developer) (born 1967), Northern Irish game developer of such games as Earthworm Jim
 David Perry (Australian filmmaker) (1933–2015), Australian filmmaker
 David Perry (cricketer) (1929–2007), New Zealand cricketer
 David Perry (rugby union) (1937–2017), England international rugby union player and captain
 David Perry (computer specialist), Public Education Director of Trend Micro
 Dave Perry (born 1966), creator of TV computer game shows
 David Perry (barrister), senior English barrister
 David Perry (politician) (born 1952), American state legislator in West Virginia
 David Perry (entrepreneur), president, CEO and director of Indigo Agriculture
 Dave Perry (law enforcement), Canadian private investigator
 David Perry, San Franciscan media relations businessman, founder of Rainbow Honor Walk
 David Perry, also known as the Norwich Puppet Man

See also 
 David Parry (disambiguation)
 Perry (disambiguation)